In linguistics, switch-reference (SR) describes any clause-level morpheme that signals whether certain prominent arguments in 'adjacent' clauses are coreferential.  In most cases, it marks whether the subject of the verb in one clause is coreferent with that of the previous clause, or of a subordinate clause to the matrix (main) clause that is dominating it.

Meanings of switch-reference
The basic distinction made by a switch-reference system is whether the following clause has the same subject (SS) or a different subject (DS). That is known as canonical switch-reference. For purposes of switch-reference, subject is defined as it is for languages with a nominative–accusative alignment: a subject is the sole argument of an intransitive clause or the agent of a transitive one. It holds even in languages with a high degree of ergativity. 

The Washo language of California and Nevada exhibits a switch-reference system. When the subject of one verb is the same as the subject of the following verb, the verb takes no switch-reference marker. However, if the subject of one verb differs from the subject of the following verb, the verb takes the "different subject" marker, -š (examples from Mithun 1999:269):

The Seri language of northwestern Mexico also has a switch-reference system which is similar in most ways to those of other languages except for one very salient fact: the relevant argument in a passive clause is not the superficial subject of the passive verb but rather the always unexpressed underlying subject. In clauses with subject raising, it is the raised subject that is relevant.

Non-subject switch-reference 

The nominative subject is not always marked by switch-reference. For instance, many clauses, including those with impersonal or weather verbs, have no subject at all but can both bear and trigger switch-reference.

Non-canonical switch-reference
In addition, many languages exhibit non-canonical switch-reference, the co-referents of arguments other than the subject being marked by switch-reference. Here is an example from Kiowa (Watkins 1993):

In this case, the use of the same-subject marker gɔ rather than the switch-reference marker nɔ indicates that the two subjects wrote letters at the same time, to the same person, and with the same subject (Watkins 1993).

Form of switch-reference markers 

Switch-reference markers often carry additional meanings or are at least fused with connectives that carry them. For instance, a switch-reference marker might mark a different subject and sequential events.  

Switch-reference markers often appear attached to verbs, but they are not a verbal category. They often appear attached to sentence-initial particles, sentence-initial recapitulative verbs, adverbial conjunctions ('when', 'because', etc.), or coordinators ('and' or 'but' though it seems never 'or'), relativizers ('which,'that'), or sentence complementizers ('that'). They can also appear as free morphemes or as differing agreement paradigms. However, most switch-reference languages are subject–object–verb languages, with verbs as well as complementizers and conjunctions coming at the end of clauses. Therefore, switch-reference often appears attached to verbs, a fact that has led to the common but erroneous claim that switch-reference is a verbal category.

One certain typological fact about switch-reference is that switch-reference markers appear at the 'edges' of clauses. It is found at the edge of either a subordinate clause (referring to the matrix clause) or at the edge of a coordinate clause (referring to the previous clause). It is also very common in clause-chaining languages of New Guinea, where it is found at the edge of medial clauses.

Switch-reference is also sensitive to syntactic structure. It can skip a clause that is string-adjacent (spoken one right after another) and refer to a matrix clause. For instance, in the configuration [A[B][C]], for which B and C are subordinate clauses to A, any switch-reference-marking on C refers to A, not B.

Distribution of switch-reference

It is found in hundreds of languages in North America, South America, Australia, New Guinea (particularly in the Trans-New Guinea phylum, but not in many Papuan language families of northern New Guinea), and the South Pacific. Typologies exist for North America (Jacobsen 1983), Australia (Austin 1981), and New Guinea (Roberts 1997).   

It spreads generally by areal diffusion, which accounts for the fact that the morphological marking varies from one language to the next.

Notes

References

Austin, Peter. (1981).  "Switch-Reference in Australia".  Language 57.
Farrell, Patrick; Stephen A. Marlett; & David M. Perlmutter. (1991). Notions of subjecthood and switch-reference: Evidence from Seri. Linguistic Inquiry 22:431-456.
Finer, Daniel. (1985).  "The syntax of switch-reference".  Linguistic Inquiry 16: 35-55.
Haiman, John, and Pamela Munro, eds. (1983). Switch Reference and Universal Grammar. Amsterdam: Benjamins.
Jacobsen, William. (1983).  "Typological and Genetic Notes on Switch-Reference in North American Languages". In  Haiman and Munro.
Mithun, Marianne (1999). The Languages of Native North America. Cambridge: Cambridge University Press.
Marlett, Stephen A. (1984). '"Switch-reference and subject raising in Seri." Syntax and semantics 16: the syntax of Native American Languages, pp. 247–68, eds. E.-D. Cook & D. Gerdts. New York: Academic Press.
Roberts, John (1997). Switch-Reference in Papua New Guinea, 101–241. Number 3 in Papers in Papuan Linguistics. Canberra, ACT, Australia: Australian National University.
Stirling, Lesley (1993). "Switch-Reference and Discourse Representation". Cambridge, England: Cambridge U. Press.
van Gijn, Rik & Hammond, Jeremy (eds.) (2016). Switch reference 2.0. Amsterdam: Benjamins.
Watkins, Laurel (1993).  "The Discourse Function of Kiowa Switch-Reference". International Journal of American Linguistics 59.

Grammar
Ambiguity